Kordali may refer to:
 Kordali language, a Kurdish language of Iran and Iraq
 Kordali, Ardabil, a village in Iran